A blook is a printed book that contains or is based on content from a blog.

The first printed blook was User Interface Design for Programmers, by Joel Spolsky, published by Apress on June 26, 2001, based on his blog Joel on Software. An early blook was written by Tony Pierce in 2002 when he compiled selected posts from his one-year-old blog and turned the collection into a book called "Blook". The name came about when Pierce held a contest, asking his readers to suggest a title for the book. Jeff Jarvis of BuzzMachine won the contest and subsequently invented the term. Pierce went on to publish two other blooks, How To Blog and Stiff.

Print-on-demand publisher Lulu inaugurated the Lulu Blooker Prize for blooks, which was first awarded in 2006. The printed blook phenomenon is not limited to self-publishing. Several popular bloggers have signed book deals with major publishers to write books based on their blogs. However, some publishers are starting to realize that blog popularity does not translate to sales. Blog to book conversions via traditional publishing houses still happen, but the focus has shifted from blog popularity to content quality.

"Blook" was short-listed in 2006 for inclusion in the Oxford English Dictionary and was a runner-up for Word of the Year.

See also 
 Digital library
 List of digital library projects
 Dynabook
 Elibrary
 Expanded Books
 Networked book
 Webserial
 OpenReader Consortium
 Project Gutenberg

References

Blogging
Books by type
Documents
Paper products
Web fiction